Global Citizen may refer to:

Global citizenship, the concept that one's identity transcends geography or political borders
Global Citizen (organization), an international advocacy organization fighting to end extreme poverty
Global Citizen Festival, an annual music festival started in 2012 and organized by Global Citizen